Rubus insulanus is a North American species of flowering plants in the rose family. It has been found only in the States of Rhode Island, Connecticut, and New York in the northeastern United States.

The genetics of Rubus is extremely complex, so that it is difficult to decide on which groups should be recognized as species. There are many rare species with limited ranges such as this. Further study is suggested to clarify the taxonomy.

References

insulanus
Plants described in 1945
Flora of Rhode Island
Flora of Connecticut
Flora of New York (state)
Flora without expected TNC conservation status